The National Premier Leagues South Australia (often abbreviated to NPL South Australia or NPL SA) is a semi-professional football competition in the Australian state of South Australia. The league is a subdivision of the second tier National Premier Leagues, which sits below the A-League on the national pyramid. The competition is controlled by Football South Australia, the governing body for the sport in the state.

History
In 2012 it was announced that the FFSA Premier League was to become the top tier of South Australian football (below the national A-League) after the disbandment of the now defunct FFSA Super League. It was announced that the competition would consist of 14 teams. These teams would be made up of the 10 teams from the defunct Super League with the remaining 4 spots being filled by the top 4 teams from the 2012 Premier League season.

In 2013 the league joined the National Premier Leagues and was named correspondingly to NPL SA. The top placed team after the completion of the season will enter into the National Premier Leagues finals and will play-off against other top placed teams from interstate conferences to determine a nationwide champion.

National Premier Leagues South Australia (abbreviated as NPL SA), a subdivision of National Premier Leagues (NPL), is a semi-professional football competition in the state of South Australia. National Premier Leagues is the second-tier football competition in Australia, which sits below the Hyundai A-League and Westfield W-League on the country's football national pyramid. Football Federation Australia (FFA) embarked on a National Competition Review in October 2010, which aimed to review the football competition structure in Australia. The process of conducting the National Competition Review lasted for 20 months, and the review results were released in May 2012, in which FFA proposed to revitalise the country's state-based competitions to promote the development of elite players. As a result of this review, National Premier Leagues was established in February 2013. At the time of establishment, NPL has five subdivisions, including football teams from five corresponding state-based federations, which are Football Federation South Australia, Football Federation Tasmania, Football Queensland, Football NSW, and Capital Football. The inaugural season of NPL SA began in March 2013. Currently, this competition is run and managed by Football South Australia (formerly known as Football Federation South Australia), which is a governing body of football issues in South Australia and a competition administrator for different levels of football games in the state.

Competition format

Regular season
The regular season consists of 22 rounds, with all 12 teams playing each other home and away. The regular season typically goes from February to August. At the end of the regular season, the team who finishes first is crowned premier and qualifies for the National Premier Leagues finals series. The bottom two teams, placed 11th and 12th are relegated to next season's State League 1. All teams are eligible to be relegated, including Adelaide United Youth.

Finals series
The finals series is held across 4 weeks. The first week consists of the 3rd placed team from the regular season playing against the 6th placed team, and 4th playing against 5th. The winners of these games qualify for the minor semi-final in the second week. The winner of the minor semi-final qualifies for the preliminary final. Throughout week 1 and 2, the 1st and 2nd placed team from the regular season playoff in a two legged game. The winner of this game qualifies for the grand final, whereas the loser qualifies for the preliminary final, playing off against the winner of the minor semi-final. The preliminary final is played in the third week, and the winner of this game qualifies for the grand final, which is held in the fourth week of finals. This game is held at ServiceFM Stadium, where the winner is crowned champion.

NPL SA Player Point System (PPS) 
Player Points System, abbreviated as PPS, refers to a system that calculates and records the points of players in NPL clubs. It was after the issue of the National Competitions Review (NCR) in 2012 that the Player Points System (PPS) was introduced for the National Premier Leagues, as a complement to the Club Licensing framework. The introduction of PPS aimed to:

1) Provide Australia football players with more opportunities;

Promoting players’ development through the youth development structures whilst delivering the NCR objectives and outcomes;

2) Promote the long-term sustainability of NPL clubs by adjusting Players’ salaries;

3) Ensure the parity and competitive balance amongst NPL clubs;

4) Improve the stability of NPL Club Player Rosters;

5) Encourage players to progress through to a National Elite Pathway Team.

Note: A National Elite Pathway Team refers to a team, determined by the FFA Technical Department and the Member Federations, to take part in the National Elite Pathway. If a player moves through the National Elite Pathway, certain points are credited for that.

There are two different types of NPL Club teams: NPL Club Age-Eligible Team and the First Team. NPL Club Age Eligible Team refers to those facing an age restriction, such as U16s, U18s, and U20s, whilst the First Team means the senior team of NPL Club. Only in limited circumstances can players from the NPL Club's Age-Eligible Teams be promoted to the First Team Player Roster, As outlined under First Team Player Roster Requirements, if a NPL club does not promote a player from its NPL Age-Eligible Teams onto the First Team Player Roster, the club is only allowed to promote the player to the First Team up to a maximum of 40% of matches throughout a NPL season. If the percentage exceeds 40%, the club must include the player on the NPL Club's First Team Player Roster.

The First Team should remain within the PPS Points Cap, which applies to NPL Club's First Team Player Roster. In NPL 2019 season, the Member Federation, in consultation with FFA, set the PPS Points Cap, which was up to a maximum of 200 points. According to this, each NPL player is attributed of 10 points as the beginning. During the season, a player's value of points is added or deducted depending on certain characteristics (see table below). It is further required that a player's points value should not be less than 0 points.

NPL SA digital presence 
Increasing the digital presence of NPL SA has been a strategic focus of Football South Australia in recent years. Since the 2019 season, all NPL SA fixtures have been digitally recorded. Media releases of home and away games are delivered on the official website of Football South Australia. As Football South Australia continued to expand their digital offerings, they also celebrated the history of NPL SA clubs by creating a history makers series, showing the clubs’ development stories and their cultural heritage to the football family. This series has attracted more than 250,000 individual viewers. In the 2020 season, the audience could watch all NPL game broadcasts.

The Celebration Of Football 
The Celebration of Football is an annually held event that allows all members of the South Australian football family to join and celebrate the achievements that have been achieved during the past season. In 2022, the Celebration of Football was held at the Adelaide Convention Centre, attracting more than 950 members to attend. The following players were apart of the Team of the Year.

Players' Development Pathways 
Regional Football Programme

NPL SA, under the management of Football South Australia, has established development pathways to allow talented young footballers to enter NPL competitions and used motion analysis to monitor the progress of elite soccer (Christopher et al., 2008). In 2013, the Regional Football Programme was introduced by FSA to provide services and support to regional players. In 2019, more than 160 regional players from all over the state joined the programme held in Adelaide, receiving education and coaching from a selected group of experienced football coaches. The number of regional squads has also increased, for: 
 Under 16 Girls
 Under 14 Girls
 Under 16 Boys
 Under 14 Boys
 Under 12 Boys
 SINGA CUP

In the Regional Football Programme, there is a selection process for teams that would visit Singapore to compete for the SINGA CUP. A total of 80 players traveled to Singapore and were tested in humid and tough conditions. This was a development opportunity for regional players to compete with opponents from the member countries and regions of the Asian Football Confederation, such as Japan, Indonesia, India, Malaysia, Philippines, Thailand, and Taiwan. This is a 20-team competition, and Under 16 Boys from South Australia finished the competition in the 3rd place.

Clubs for 2023 season

Honours

For details of winners pre-NPL (2006–2012):

See also
Soccer in South Australia
National Premier Leagues
National Premier Leagues Capital Football
National Premier Leagues NSW
National Premier Leagues Northern NSW
National Premier Leagues Queensland
National Premier Leagues Tasmania
National Premier Leagues Victoria
National Premier Leagues Western Australia

Notes

References

External links
 Official website

2
Sports leagues established in 2005
2005 establishments in Australia
National Premier Leagues